The Salem Spartans (SS) is the franchise based cricket team based in Salem, Tamil Nadu, India, which has been playing in Tamil Nadu Premier League (TNPL) from this season 2021. They are one of the eight teams compete in 2021 Tamil Nadu Premier League. Salem Spartans previously lifted one TNPL title in 2016 as Tuti Patriots.

Background 
Salem Spartans kicked off the 2021 TNPL by releasing by 5 players from the team.

Retained Players: Praanesh B, Abhiske S, Akshay Srinivasan, Ashwin M, Boopalan S, Daryl S Ferrario (C), Ganesh Moorthi M, Gopinath K H, Lokesh Raj T D, Periyasamy G, Shubham Mehta S, Sushil U (WK), Vijay Kumar M, Vijay Shankar, Washington Sundar.

Released Players: Siva Kumar M K, Akkil Srinaath, Raj Kumar T, Suganesh M, Prashanth Prabhu D.

Drafted Players: Karthikeyan R, Kishoor G, Aarif A, R Karthikeyan, M Suganesh, Abhinav Vishnu, AVR Rathnam.

Replaced Player: Mihir R replaced for Vijay Kumar M.

Squad 

 Players with international caps are listed in bold.
 Players with state caps are listed in italic.

Administration and support staffs

Sponsors and kit manufacturers

Teams and standings

Results by match

League table

  Advanced to the qualifiers
  Advanced  to the eliminator
  Eliminated from Tournament

Tournament summary

2021

League stage 
Match no. : 01 

Match no : 07 

Match no: 12 

Match no : 15 

Match no : 18 

Match no : 23 

Match no : 26

Statistics

Most runs

Most wickets

Awards and achievements

Awards 
Man of the Match

Images

See also 
 Salem Spartans
 2021 Tamil Nadu Premier League

References 

Tamil Nadu Premier League
Salem Spartans
Cricket teams in India